Marka is the name of the forested and hilly areas surrounding Oslo, Norway. It includes areas within the municipality of Oslo, but also large areas in Hole, Ringerike, Jevnaker, Lunner, Nittedal, Bærum, Asker, and other municipalities in Viken county.  The name is actually just the finite form of mark (Norse mǫrk f) 'woodland, forest'. (See also Finnmark, Hedmark, Telemark, Marker and Aremark.)

Though not designated a borough of Oslo, it is a major recreational area for the population of Oslo, and development in the area is for the most part prohibited. Despite being used frequently by many inhabitants of Oslo, especially at weekends, the fauna of marka includes species such as lynx, wolf, beaver, moose and roe deer.

The term Oslomarka is usually used for all the recreational areas around Oslo. Marka is the administrative name for the part of it that lies inside the city limits. Neighboring municipalities (most of which lie in Viken) do not have the same kind of administrative division as Oslo, and thus do not have any separate administrative arrangement for their parts of the area. The area within Oslo municipality is divided into two parts. The population and agricultural areas of Marka are located mainly in two valleys, Sørkedalen and Maridalen.
 

Oslomarka is further divided into:
Kjekstadmarka
Vestmarka
Krokskogen
 Bærumsmarka
Nordmarka
Romeriksåsen
Lillomarka
Gjelleråsen
Østmarka
Sørmarka
Of these, Vestmarka, Kjekstadmarka, Romeriksåsene, Follomarka and Sørmarka lie almost entirely outside the city limits.

References

External links 

 Official website

 
Boroughs of Oslo
Geography of Oslo
Forests and woodlands of Norway